Armando Anthony "Chick" Corea (June 12, 1941 – February 9, 2021) was an American jazz composer, pianist, keyboardist, bandleader, and occasional percussionist. His compositions "Spain", "500 Miles High", "La Fiesta", "Armando's Rhumba", and "Windows" are widely considered jazz standards. As a member of Miles Davis's band in the late 1960s, he participated in the birth of jazz fusion. In the 1970s he formed Return to Forever. Along with McCoy Tyner, Herbie Hancock, and Keith Jarrett, Corea is considered to have been one of the foremost jazz pianists of the post-John Coltrane era.

Corea continued to collaborate frequently while exploring different musical styles throughout the 1980s and 1990s. He won 27 Grammy Awards and was nominated more than 60 times for the award.

Early life and education
Armando Corea was born in Chelsea, Massachusetts on June 12, 1941, to parents Anna (née Zaccone) and Armando J. Corea. He was of southern Italian descent, his father having been born to an immigrant from Albi comune, in the Province of Catanzaro in the Calabria region. His father, a trumpeter who led a Dixieland band in Boston in the 1930s and 1940s, introduced him to the piano at the age of four. Surrounded by jazz, he was influenced at an early age by bebop and Dizzy Gillespie, Charlie Parker, Bud Powell, Horace Silver, and Lester Young. When he was eight, he took up drums, which would influence his use of the piano as a percussion instrument.

Corea developed his piano skills while exploring music on his own. A notable influence was concert pianist Salvatore Sullo, from whom Corea began taking lessons at age eight; Sullo introduced him to classical music, helping spark his interest in musical composition. He also was a performer and soloist for several years in the St. Rose Scarlet Lancers, a drum and bugle corps based in Chelsea.

Given a black tuxedo by his father, he started playing gigs while still in high school. He enjoyed listening to Herb Pomeroy's band at the time and had a trio that played Horace Silver's music at a local jazz club. He eventually moved to New York City, where he studied music at Columbia University, then transferred to the Juilliard School. He quit both after finding them disappointing, but remained in New York.

Career

Corea began his professional recording and touring career in the early 1960s with Mongo Santamaria, Willie Bobo, Blue Mitchell, Herbie Mann, and Stan Getz. In 1966 he recorded his debut album, Tones for Joan's Bones which was not released until 1968. Two years later he released a highly regarded trio album, Now He Sings, Now He Sobs, with drummer Roy Haynes and bassist Miroslav Vitouš.

In 1968, Corea began recording and touring with Miles Davis, appearing on the widely praised Davis studio albums Filles de Kilimanjaro, In a Silent Way, Bitches Brew, and On the Corner. He appeared as well as the later compilation albums Big Fun, Water Babies, and Circle in the Round.

In concert performances he frequently processed the sound of his electric piano through a ring modulator. Utilizing the unique style, he appeared on multiple live Davis albums including Black Beauty: Live at the Fillmore West, and Miles Davis at Fillmore: Live at the Fillmore East. His membership in the Davis band continued until 1970, with the final touring band he was part of consisting of saxophonist Steve Grossman, fellow pianist Keith Jarrett (here playing electric organ), bassist Dave Holland, percussionist Airto Moreira, drummer Jack DeJohnette, and Davis himself on trumpet.

Holland and Corea departed the Davis group at the same time to form their own free jazz group, Circle, also featuring multireedist Anthony Braxton and drummer Barry Altschul. They were active from 1970 to 1971, and recorded on Blue Note and ECM. Aside from exploring an atonal style, Corea sometimes reached into the body of the piano and plucked the strings. In 1971, Corea decided to work in a solo context, recording the sessions that became Piano Improvisations Vol. 1 and Piano Improvisations Vol. 2 for ECM in April of that year.

The concept of communication with an audience became a big thing for me at the time. The reason I was using that concept so much at that point in my life–in 1968, 1969 or so–was because it was a discovery for me. I grew up kind of only thinking how much fun it was to tinkle on the piano and not noticing that what I did had an effect on others. I did not even think about a relationship to an audience, really, until way later.

Jazz fusion

Named after their eponymous 1972 album, Corea's Return to Forever band relied on both acoustic and electronic instrumentation and initially drew upon Hispanic music styles more than rock music. On their first two records, the group consisted of Flora Purim on vocals and percussion, Joe Farrell on flute and soprano saxophone, Miles Davis bandmate Airto on drums and percussion, and Stanley Clarke on acoustic double bass. Drummer Lenny White and guitarist Bill Connors later joined Corea and Clarke to form the second version of the group, which blended the earlier Latin music elements with rock and funk-oriented music partially inspired by the Mahavishnu Orchestra, led by his Bitches Brew bandmate John McLaughlin. This incarnation of the band recorded the album Hymn of the Seventh Galaxy, before Connors' replacement by Al Di Meola, who later played on Where Have I Known You Before, No Mystery and Romantic Warrior.

In 1976, Corea released My Spanish Heart, influenced by Hispanic music and featuring vocalist Gayle Moran (Corea's wife) and violinist Jean-Luc Ponty. The album combined jazz and flamenco, supported by Minimoog synthesizer and a horn section.

Duet projects

In the 1970s, Corea started working with vibraphonist Gary Burton, with whom he recorded several duet albums for ECM, including 1972's Crystal Silence. They reunited in 2006 for a concert tour. A new record called The New Crystal Silence was issued in 2008 and won a Grammy Award in 2009. The package includes a disc of duets and another disc with the Sydney Symphony Orchestra.

Towards the end of the 1970s, Corea embarked on a series of concerts with fellow pianist Herbie Hancock. These concerts were presented in elegant settings with both artists dressed formally and performing on concert grand pianos. The two played each other's compositions, as well as pieces by other composers such as Béla Bartók, and duets. In 1982, Corea performed The Meeting, a live duet with the classical pianist Friedrich Gulda.

In December 2007, Corea recorded a duet album, The Enchantment, with banjoist Béla Fleck. Fleck and Corea toured extensively for the album in 2007. Fleck was nominated in the Best Instrumental Composition category at the 49th Grammy Awards for the track "Spectacle".

In 2008, Corea collaborated with Japanese pianist Hiromi Uehara on the live album Duet (Chick Corea and Hiromi). The duo played a concert at Tokyo's Budokan arena on April 30.

In 2015, he reprised the duet concert series with Hancock, again sticking to a dueling-piano format, though both now integrated synthesizers into their repertoire. The first concert in this series was at the Paramount Theatre in Seattle and included improvisations, compositions by the duo, and standards by other composers.

Later work
Corea's other bands included the Chick Corea Elektric Band, its trio reduction called “Akoustic Band”, Origin, and its trio reduction called the New Trio. Corea signed a record deal with GRP Records in 1986 which led to the release of ten albums between 1986 and 1994, seven with the Elektric Band, two with the Akoustic Band, and a solo album, Expressions.

The Akoustic Band released a self-titled album in 1989 and a live follow-up, Alive, in 1991, both featuring John Patitucci on bass and Dave Weckl on drums. It marked a return to traditional jazz trio instrumentation in Corea's career, and the bulk of his subsequent recordings have featured acoustic piano. 

In 1992, Corea started his own label, Stretch Records.

In 2001, the Chick Corea New Trio, with bassist Avishai Cohen and drummer Jeff Ballard, released the album Past, Present & Futures. The eleven-song album includes only one standard (Fats Waller's "Jitterbug Waltz"). The rest of the tunes are Corea originals. He participated in 1998's Like Minds with old associates Gary Burton on vibraphone, Dave Holland on bass, Roy Haynes on drums, and Pat Metheny playing guitars.

During the later part of his career, Corea also explored contemporary classical music. He composed his first piano concerto–and an adaptation of his signature piece, "Spain", for a full symphony orchestra–and performed it in 1999 with the London Philharmonic Orchestra. In 2004 he composed his first work without keyboards: his String Quartet No. 1 was written for the Orion String Quartet and performed by them at 2004's Summerfest in Wisconsin.

Corea continued recording fusion albums such as To the Stars (2004) and Ultimate Adventure (2006). The latter won the Grammy Award for Best Jazz Instrumental Album, Individual or Group.

In 2008, the third version of Return to Forever (Corea, Stanley Clarke, Lenny White, and Di Meola) reunited for a worldwide tour. The reunion received positive reviews from jazz and mainstream publications. Most of the group's studio recordings were re-released on the compilation Return to Forever: The Anthology to coincide with the tour. A concert DVD recorded during their performance at the Montreux Jazz Festival was released in May 2009. He also worked on a collaboration CD with the vocal group The Manhattan Transfer.

A new group, the Five Peace Band, began a world tour in October 2008. The ensemble included John McLaughlin whom Corea had previously worked with in Miles Davis's late 1960s bands, including the group that recorded Davis's classic album Bitches Brew. Joining Corea and McLaughlin were saxophonist Kenny Garrett and bassist Christian McBride. Drummer Vinnie Colaiuta played with the band in Europe and on select North American dates; Brian Blade played all dates in Asia and Australia, and most dates in North America. The vast reach of Corea's music was celebrated in a 2011 retrospective with Corea guesting with the Jazz at Lincoln Center Orchestra in the Lincoln Center for the Performing Arts; a New York Times reviewer had high praise for the occasion: "Mr. Corea was masterly with the other musicians, absorbing the rhythm and feeding the soloists. It sounded like a band, and Mr. Corea had no need to dominate; his authority was clear without raising volume."

A new band, Chick Corea & The Vigil, featured Corea with bassist Hadrien Feraud, Marcus Gilmore on drums (carrying on from his grandfather, Roy Haynes), saxes, flute, and bass clarinet from Origin vet Tim Garland, and guitarist Charles Altura.

Corea celebrated his 75th birthday in 2016 by playing with more than 20 different groups during a six-week stand at the Blue Note Jazz Club in Greenwich Village, New York City. "I pretty well ignore the numbers that make up 'age'. It seems to be the best way to go. I have always just concentrated on having the most fun I can with the adventure of music."

Personal life
Corea and his first wife Joanie had two children, Thaddeus and Liana, though the marriage ended in divorce. In 1972, Corea married his second wife, vocalist/pianist Gayle Moran. 

In 1968, Corea read Dianetics, author L. Ron Hubbard's most well-known self-help book, and developed an interest in Hubbard's other works in the early 1970s: "I came into contact with L. Ron Hubbard's material in 1968 with Dianetics and it kind of opened my mind up and it got me into seeing that my potential for communication was a lot greater than I thought it was."

Corea said that Scientology became a profound influence on his musical direction in the early 1970s: "I no longer wanted to satisfy myself. I really want to connect with the world and make my music mean something to people." He also introduced his colleague Stanley Clarke to the movement. With Clarke Corea played on Space Jazz: The soundtrack of the book Battlefield Earth, a 1982 album to accompany L. Ron Hubbard's novel Battlefield Earth.

Corea was excluded from a concert during the 1993 World Championships in Athletics in Stuttgart, Germany. The concert's organizers excluded him after the state government of Baden-Württemberg had announced it would review its subsidies for events featuring avowed members of Scientology. After Corea's complaint against this policy before the administrative court was unsuccessful in 1996, members of the United States Congress, in a letter to the German government, denounced the ban as a violation of Corea's human rights. Corea was not banned from performing in Germany, however, and had several appearances at the government-supported International Jazz Festival in Burghausen; he was awarded a plaque on Burghausen's "Street of Fame" in 2011.

Corea died of a rare form of cancer shortly after his diagnosis. He died at his home near Tampa Bay, Florida on February 9, 2021, at the age of 79.

Discography

Awards and honors 

Corea's 1968 album Now He Sings, Now He Sobs was inducted into the Grammy Hall of Fame in 1999.  In 1997, he was awarded an Honorary Doctorate of Music from Berklee College of Music. In 2010, he was named Doctor Honoris Causa at the Norwegian University of Science and Technology (NTNU).

Grammy Awards

Corea won 27 Grammy Awards and was nominated 71 times for the award.

Latin Grammy Awards

References

External links 

 Official site
 Official discography
 
 An Interview with Chick Corea by Bob Rosenbaum, July 1974
 Chick Corea talks to Michael J Stewart about his Piano Concerto
 Chick Corea Interview NAMM Oral History Library (2016, 2018)
 

1941 births
2021 deaths
20th-century American keyboardists
20th-century American pianists
20th-century jazz composers
21st-century American keyboardists
21st-century American pianists
21st-century jazz composers
American Scientologists
American jazz composers
American jazz pianists
American male jazz composers
American male pianists
American people of Italian descent
People of Sicilian descent
People of Calabrian descent
Chick Corea Elektric Band members
Circle (jazz band) members
Crossover (music)
Deaths from cancer in Florida
ECM Records artists
Grammy Award winners
GRP All-Star Big Band members
GRP Records artists
Jazz fusion pianists
Jazz musicians from Massachusetts
Keytarists
Latin Grammy Award winners
Miles Davis
People from Chesterfield, Massachusetts
Post-bop composers
Post-bop pianists
Return to Forever members
The Jazz Messengers members